The 1958 Singapore Open, also known as the 1958 Singapore Open Badminton Championships, took place from 1 – 4 August 1958 at the Singapore Badminton Hall in Singapore.

Venue
Singapore Badminton Hall

Final results

References 

Singapore Open (badminton)
1958 in badminton